The year 1719 in architecture involved some significant architectural events and new buildings.

Buildings and structures

Buildings completed

 The Catholic parish church of St. John the Baptist, Stamsried, Bavaria, Germany.
 Chiesa di San Michele Arcangelo, Anacapri, Italy.
 St Mary's Church, Tarleton, England.
 St. Werburgh's Church, Dublin (Church of Ireland), designed by Colonel Thomas Burgh, Surveyor General of Ireland.
 Chapel and Hall, The Queen's College, Oxford, England.
 The house of William Trent, Trenton, New Jersey, United States.

Births
date unknown – Dmitry Ukhtomsky, chief architect of Moscow (died 1774)

Deaths
March 10 – Jean-Baptiste Alexandre Le Blond, French architect and garden designer who became the chief architect of Saint Petersburg (born 1679)
November 22 – William Talman, English architect and landscape designer (born 1650)

References

architecture
Years in architecture
18th-century architecture